Events from the year 1848 in the United States.

Incumbents

Federal Government
 President: James K. Polk (D-Tennessee)
 Vice President: George M. Dallas (D-Pennsylvania)
 Chief Justice: Roger B. Taney (Maryland)
 Speaker of the House of Representatives: Robert Charles Winthrop (W-Massachusetts)
 Congress: 30th

Events

January–March
 January 24 – California Gold Rush: James W. Marshall finds gold at Sutter's Mill, in Coloma, California.
 January 31 – The Washington Monument is established.
 February 2 – Mexican–American War: The Treaty of Guadalupe Hidalgo is signed, ending the war and ceding to the U.S. virtually all of what becomes the southwestern United States.
 March 18 – The Boston Public Library is founded by an act of the Great and General Court of Massachusetts.

April–June
 April 3 – The Chicago Board of Trade is founded by 82 Chicago merchants and business leaders.
 April 23 – The Illinois and Michigan Canal is completed.
 May 19 – The Treaty of Guadalupe Hidalgo (February 2), ending the Mexican–American War, is ratified by the Mexican government.
 May 29 – Wisconsin is admitted as the 30th U.S. state (see History of Wisconsin).
 June 14–15 – The Liberty Party National Convention is held in Buffalo, New York. Presidential candidate Gerrit Smith establishes woman suffrage as a party plank.

July–September
 July 19 – Seneca Falls Convention: The first women's rights convention opens in Seneca Falls, New York.
 July 26 – The University of Wisconsin–Madison is founded.
 August 14 – Oregon Territory is established.
 August 19 – California Gold Rush: The New York Herald breaks the news to the East Coast of the United States that there is a gold rush in California (although the rush started in January).
 September 12 – One of the successes of the Revolutions of 1848, the Swiss Federal Constitution, patterned on the U.S. Constitution, enters into force, creating a federal republic and one of the first modern democratic states in Europe.
 September 13 – Vermont railroad worker Phineas Gage incredibly survives a 3-foot-plus iron rod being driven through his head.

October–December
 November 1 – The first medical school for women, The Boston Female Medical School (which later merges with Boston University School of Medicine), opens in Boston, Massachusetts.
 November 7 – U.S. presidential election, 1848: Whig Zachary Taylor of Louisiana defeats Democrat Lewis Cass of Michigan in the first U.S. presidential election to be held in every state on the same day.
 December 26 – The Phi Delta Theta fraternity is founded at Miami University.

No fixed date
 A cholera epidemic in New York kills 5,000.
 The University of Mississippi admits its first students.
 Geneva College (Pennsylvania) is founded as Geneva Hall in Northwood, Logan County, Ohio.
 Rhodes College is founded in Clarksville, Tennessee as the Masonic University of Tennessee.
 The Shaker song "Simple Gifts" is written by Joseph Brackett in Alfred, Maine.

Ongoing
 Mexican–American War (1846–1848)
 California Gold Rush (1848–1855)

Births
 January 13 – Lilla Cabot Perry, painter (died 1933)
 February 20 – E. H. Harriman, railroad executive (died 1909)
 February 22 – Emily McGary Selinger, painter, author and educator (died 1927)
 March 8 – LaMarcus Adna Thompson, inventor (died 1919)
 March 19 – Wyatt Earp, lawman and gunfighter (died 1929)
 March 26 – Edward O. Wolcott, U.S. Senator from Colorado from 1889 to 1901 (died 1905)
 May 10 – Lafayette Young, U.S. Senator from Iowa from 1910 to 1911 (died 1926)
 June 15 – Sol Smith Russell, comedian (died 1902)
 July 22 – Winfield Scott Stratton, miner (died 1902)
 August 24 – Kate Claxton, actress (died 1924)
 September 4 – Lewis Howard Latimer, African American inventor (died 1928)
 September 29 – Caroline Yale, educator (died 1933)
 October 6  – Webb C. Ball, jeweler and watchmaker from Fredericktown, Ohio (died 1922)
 October 15 – Harmon Northrop Morse, chemist (died 1920)
 November 1 – Caroline Still Anderson, African American physician, educator and activist (died 1919)
 November 2 – Stephen Mallory II, U.S. Senator from Florida from 1897 to 1907 (died 1907)
 November 7 – B. B. Comer, 33rd Governor of Alabama, U.S. Senator from Alabama in 1920 (died 1927)
 November 20 – James M. Spangler, inventor (died 1915) 
 November 27 – Henry A. Rowland, physicist (died 1901)

Deaths
 February 11 – Thomas Cole, landscape painter (born 1801 in the United Kingdom)
 February 23 – John Quincy Adams, sixth President of the United States from 1825 to 1829 (born 1767)
 March 29 – John Jacob Astor, businessman (born 1763)
 April 29 – Chester Ashley, U.S. Senator from Arkansas from 1844 to 1848 (born 1790)
 May 18 – William Leidesdorff, businessman (born 1810)
 June 26 – Stevenson Archer, U.S. Congressman from Maryland from 1819 to 1821 (born 1786)
 July 20 – Francis R. Shunk, politician (born 1788)
 August 15 – Timothy Olmstead, composer, fifer in the American Revolutionary War (born 1759)
 August 30 – Simon Willard, horologist (born 1753)
 October 25 – Dixon Hall Lewis, U.S. Senator from Alabama from 1844 to 1848 (born 1802)
 December 31 – Ambrose Hundley Sevier, U.S. Senator from Arkansas from 1836 to 1848 (born 1801)

See also
Timeline of United States history (1820–1859)

Further reading

References

External links
 

 
1840s in the United States
United States
United States
Years of the 19th century in the United States